Louise Brealey (born 27 March 1979), also credited as Loo Brealey, is an English actress, writer and journalist. She played Molly Hooper in Sherlock, Cass in Back, Scottish professor Jude McDermid in Clique, Gillian Chamberlain in A Discovery of Witches and Donna Harman in Death in Paradise.

Education
Born in Bozeat, Northamptonshire, England, Brealey won a scholarship for Kimbolton School and went on to read history at Girton College, Cambridge. She trained at the Lee Strasberg Institute in New York City and with clown teacher Philippe Gaulier in Paris.

Writing 
Brealey has written on cinema, art and music since her teens, contributing reviews and features for magazines including Premiere UK, Empire, SKY, The Face, Neon and Total Film. She is the editor of Anarchy and Alchemy: The Films of Alejandro Jodorowsky (Creation Books, 2007). Until April 2009, Brealey was the deputy editor of Wonderland magazine. 
A freelance Associate Producer, she has written documentary pitches for BBC Arts.
In 2013 her first play Pope Joan was performed by the National Youth Theatre. Her monologue Go Back To Where You Came From was performed as part of Paines Plough Theatre's Come To Where I'm From project in 2018.

Acting

Screen

Brealey made her TV debut as Nurse Roxanne Bird in two series of BBC drama Casualty before playing Judy Smallweed in Bleak House. Terry Wogan took Judy and her snaggle-toothed grandfather Smallweed (Phil Davis) to heart, regaling Radio 2 listeners with regular renditions of Davis' catchphrase "Shake me up, Judy!". Brealey followed Bleak House with a comic turn as Anorak, Alistair MacGowan's black-bobbed sidekick, in comedy drama Mayo, described by The Hollywood Reporter as "Agatha Christie does Moonlighting".

Brealey plays pathologist Molly Hooper in all four series of Steven Moffat and Mark Gatiss's television drama, Sherlock.

Brealey is often asked to work in accents, playing a doughty Yorkshire doctor in Ripper Street, a Cockney ne'er-do-well in Law & Order: UK, a broken Geordie widow in Inspector George Gently and a ball-breaking Edinburgh academic in Clique.

Brealey played a leading role in the ITV drama The Widow, first broadcast in March 2019.

Stage

Her stage debut was at London's Royal Court in 2001 as 14-year-old Sophie in Max Stafford-Clark's production of Judy Upton's Sliding With Suzanne. The Daily Telegraph called her performance "a perfect poignant study of adolescence".

Her portrayal of child prodigy Thomasina in the Bristol Old Vic production of Tom Stoppard's Arcadia in 2005 was described by The Daily Telegraph as "the evening belongs to Loo Brealey's Thomasina".

Brealey worked twice with Sir Peter Hall. First in 2007 on Simon Gray's Little Nell, in which she played the title role opposite Michael Pennington and Tim Pigott-Smith. Based on The Invisible Woman, Claire Tomalin's award-winning biography of Charles Dickens's mistress Ellen Ternan, Little Nell followed Ternan's story from 17 to 44 years of age. Critics described Brealey's work as "impressive" (The Stage), "highly compelling" (The Independent) and "astounding" (British Theatre Guide). The following year, Hall cast her as Sonya in his critically acclaimed Uncle Vanya, the inaugural production at London's Rose Theatre. The Telegraph called hers "a name to watch" and The Independent compared her to Joan Fontaine in Rebecca. The Spectator said: "Brealey uncovers the pathetic poetry beneath the indolent superficialities. Her big disadvantage is that she’s too attractive for ‘plain’ Sonya, but she disguises this by suggesting a lack of sexual allure with awkward giggles, squirrelly movements and a stupefied beaming naivety. All brilliantly done..."

In 2011 Brealey was the sex-mad, short-frocked daughter of Julian Barratt and Doon Mackichan at the Young Vic in Richard Jones's Government Inspector. She next played three lead roles – Cassandra, Andromache and Helen of Troy – in Caroline Bird's sold-out production of The Trojan Women at London's Gate Theatre. The Times called her performances "electrifying" and The Guardian said she "pulled off a remarkable treble". Brealey talked about the roles in the Evening Standard and wrote a piece for The Times about the experience of going naked on stage, which went viral.

In February 2014 she starred as Julie in August Strindberg's Miss Julie at the Citizens Theatre in Glasgow.

More recently she won Best Actress at the Manchester Theatre Awards for her role as Marianne in Constellations, directed by Michael Longhurst and played the lead alongside Anne Marie Duff in Marianne Elliott's Husbands and Sons at the National Theatre.

Audio

Brealey is the narrator of Caitlin Moran's How to Build a Girl and its sequel How to Be Famous, Alex Michaelides’ The Silent Patient, Kate Mosse's Number One Bestseller Labyrinth and Hallie Rubenhold's The Five: The Untold Lives of the Women Killed by Jack the Ripper. She was Megan in the audiobook edition of The Girl on The Train by Paula Hawkins, which won the 2016 Audie Award for Audiobook of the Year.

Radio

Brealey voiced the part of Laura Willowes in the 2021 BBC Radio 4 adaptation of Lolly Willowes.

TV and film credits

Theatre credits

References

External links 
 Louise Brealey writing, editing website
 Louise Brealey at Spotlight
 
 
 Louise Brealey at United Agents 
 Louise Brealey at the BBC's Casualty site

Actors from Northamptonshire
English film actresses
English television actresses
English stage actresses
English radio actresses
Alumni of Girton College, Cambridge
Lee Strasberg Theatre and Film Institute alumni
Living people
21st-century English actresses
1979 births
People from North Northamptonshire
National Youth Theatre members
English journalists